Sadhana Forest is an international volunteer-based not-for-profit organization that aims to teach local citizens and volunteers about environmental renewal and sustainable living. In 2003, Yorit and Aviram Rozin started Sadhana Forest in Auroville, India.  The project also targets reforestation and water conservation in two other rural locations: Anse-à-Pitres, Haiti, and Samburu, Kenya.  Sadhana Forest works as a long-term sustainable development project.

Locations

All three Sadhana Forest locations focus on three main development and conservation projects: water, trees, and people. While the three locations have the same goals, they differ in their application.

In 2003, Sadhana Forest was founded in the community of Auroville, India. The main project of this location is the reforestation of the Tropical Dry Evergreen Forest which is currently close to total extinction as only 0.01% survives. Sadhana Forest India has a 'Children's Land' in which local children learn about sustainable living, conservation, and the appreciation of nature through the values of child-led learning or "unschooling". Children often choose to garden, paint, draw, cook, build, play games and plant trees. On April 8, 2010, Sadhana Forest Haiti was started in the community of Anse-à-pitres in the south-eastern corner of Haiti. In June 2013, Sadhana Forest established its third locality in Samburu County, Kenya.

Focus
Sadhana Forest works to combat water shortages through water conservation, permaculture, and education. Sadhana Forest aims to plant indigenous tree species in zones that have been devastated by deforestation, which is commonly a result of increased urbanization, illegal logging, fires, and fuel wood harvesting.

Sadhana Forest recognizes the negative impact that increasing climate disasters and the depletion of natural resources have on communities. These disasters and the depletion of resources are oftentimes human-created and result in farmers losing their crops and families having to migrate from their land. Sadhana Forest works to address these issues through educating the thousands of local and international volunteers that they receive each year about sustainable living patterns.

Volunteers live in eco-huts and the community relies entirely on solar and wind energy. Other sustainable practices implemented in the community are vegan organic nutrition, recycling and waste minimization, biodegradable toiletries, composting toilets and a gray water system. Those wishing to volunteer at the Sadhana Forest are expected to follow the organization's guidelines. These include the site being a drug, alcohol, competition and a tobacco-free environment. These guidelines are in place to promote a healthy and cooperative community.

Awards
On November 25, 2010, Sadhana Forest Haiti and India won third place for the Humanitarian Water and Food Award.

References

External links
Official site

Environmental organisations based in India
Organizations established in 2003